is a Japanese politician of the Democratic Party and a former member of the House of Councillors in the National Diet, having served two terms from 2004 until 2016. He previously served two terms in the Kōchi Prefectural Assembly from 1995 until 2001.

In 2015 changes to the electoral laws merged Hirota's Kōchi at-large district with the neighbouring Tokushima district, in order to address the problem of disparity in the representation of urban and rural areas. In October 2015 Hirota announced that he would not contest the merged Tokushima-Kōchi at-large district at the 2016 election as a protest against the merger. In June 2016 it was reported that Hirota would instead contest one of Kochi Prefecture's districts at the next House of Representatives election, to be held by the end of 2018. His decision meant that no candidates that contested the new district were born in Kochi Prefecture.

References 

 

1968 births
Living people
Members of the House of Councillors (Japan)
Democratic Party of Japan politicians